Emeka Ihedioha  (born 24 March 1965) is a Nigerian politician and Businessman. He is the former Governor of Imo State and a former Deputy Speaker of the Federal House of Representatives. He was removed from office as the Executive Governor of Imo state on January 14, 2020 by the Supreme Court of Nigeria which declared the APC candidate (Hope Uzodinma) the authentic winner of the 2019 Imo gubernatorial  election.

Ihedioha is a member of the Peoples Democratic Party (PDP) and represented the Aboh Mbaise/Ngor Okpala Federal Constituency of Imo State from 2003 to 2015. He was also the former deputy speaker of the House of Representatives. He holds a National Honor as Commander of the Order of the Niger (CON).

In 2015, Ihedioha served as Speaker of the House of Representatives and subsequent swearing-in of Aminu Tambuwal as the Executive Governor of Sokoto State. He became Governor of Imo State in 2019, winning the Gubernatorial race.

Early life 
Ihedioha was born on 24 March 1965 at Mbutu in Aboh Mbaise Local Government Area in Imo State, South-East Nigeria.

He attended Town School Mbutu in Aboh Mbaise and completed the same at SDA Primary School Abule Oja, Yaba in 1976. He had his secondary education at St. Ephraim's Secondary School, Owerrinta in present-day Abia State. He then proceeded to the University of Lagos, Akoka-Yaba, where he obtained a Bachelor of Science (B.SC) degree in Food Science and Technology, in 1988.

Ihedioha took an executive certificate course in financial management from Stanford University, and a leadership certificate course from Harvard Kennedy School of Government, Harvard University.

Political career
In 1992, Ihedioha was appointed press officer to the Senate President of the Federal Republic of Nigeria, Chief Iyorchia Ayu. A year later he was appointed chief press secretary to the Deputy Senate President. Following military incursion in the polity in November 1993, Ihedioha returned to his communications practice as Chief Executive Officer of First Page Communications. He became Director of Publicity of the newly formed People's Democratic Movement, the purveyor of the People Democratic Party in 1998.

He was appointed special assistant to the Presidential Adviser on Utilities in July 1999, as a special assistant on media and publicity to the President of the Senate in November 1999, and as a special assistant on political matters to the Vice President in September 2001. He won a seat in the House of Representative as a member representing Aboh Mbaise-Ngor Okpala Federal Constituency of Imo State in 2003.

He was the deputy speaker of the House of Representatives from 2011 to 2015. During this period, he served as the Speaker of the House of Representatives after Tambuwal's swearing-in as the Executive Governor of Sokoto State.

On 9 March 2019, Ihedioha contested for the gubernatorial seat for Imo State under the political platform of Peoples Democratic Party (PDP). On 11 March 2019, Ihedioha was declared Governor-elect by the  Independent National Electoral Commission (INEC) sitting in Imo State, after he defeated Uche Nwosu (son-in-law of the incumbent governor) who ran under the Action Alliance Party (AA), with a total of 273,404 votes.

He was removed from office on January 14, 2020 by a Supreme Court judgement.

Legislative activities
Between 2003 and 2007, he served as Chair, House Committee on Marine Transport. Ihedioha is credited with passing key bills that allowed for increased participation of Nigeria in that sector. These laws are:

The International Convention for the Safety at Sea (Ratification and Enforcement) Act 2004
The International Convention for the Prevention of Pollution from Ships (Ratification and Enforcement) Act 2005
The United Nations Convention on Carriage of Goods by Sea (Ratification and Enforcement) Act 2005
The International Convention on the Establishment of an International Fund for the Compensation of Oil Pollution Damage 1979 as amended (Ratification and Enforcement )Act 2006
The International Convention on the Civil Liabilities for Oil Pollution Damage (Ratification and Enforcement) Act 2006.
Merchant Shipping Act 2007
Council for the Regulation of Freight Forwarding in Nigeria Act 2007

Ihedioha was reelected in 2007, and served as Chair of the House Committee on Cooperation and Integration in Africa. He was later elected chief whip of the House, a position he held throughout that term.

Executive activities
As Governor of Imo State, Ihedioha is credited with initiating key policies that enhanced fiscal responsibility in the State. These include:

The Treasury Single Account (TSA).
The Central Billing System (CBS).
The Open Government System (OPS).
The reactivation of the Bureau for Public Procurement and Price Intelligence.

As a result of his policy measures, the National Bureau for Statistics (NBS) named Imo State as the least corrupt state in Nigeria, with a record low 17.6% corruption prevalence.

Ihedioha is also known for embarking on widespread infrastructural projects, proactive lawmaking, and proposing and enacting/signing 17 laws, within his short period as Governor.

Personal life
Ihedioha's business interests span real estate development, industrialised farming, hospitality, power and petroleum sectors. He is married to Ebere Ihedioha and has four children (three sons and a daughter). Ihedioha is an avid supporter of Arsenal football club and enjoys travelling and table tennis. He is a philanthropist, particularly within his native Imo state.

See also
List of Governors of Imo State

References

External links 
 
 
 
  
 
 
 
 

1965 births
Living people
People from Owerri
Public relations people
Imo State politicians
University of Lagos alumni
Nigerian Anglicans
Nigerian Christians
Peoples Democratic Party (Nigeria) politicians